Black Book is an adventure role-playing video game, developed by Morteshka, which created The Mooseman, and published by HypeTrain Digital. The game was released on August 10, 2021.

Taking place in 19th century Russia, the game is heavily inspired by Russian and Komi folklore narrative is based on Bailichkas. To ensure the authenticity in depiction of myths and real-life locations, the developers worked alongside Russian ethnographers.

Gameplay 
In the game, players control Vasilisa - a young sorceress, who travels across the landscape of rural Russia, aiding commonfolk along the way. The players achieve that by solving puzzles and engaging in battle using a deck-building card combat system. Throughout the journey, choices made by the player will affect the plot and general progression of the game.

Plot 
A young girl named Vasilisa, destined to become a witch, decides to throw her fate away and marry her beloved - but that dream is shattered when her betrothed dies under mysterious circumstances.

Aching for her lost love, Vasilisa seeks out Black Book - a demonic artifact, said to be powerful enough to grant any wish to the one who uncovers all 7 of its seals.

Development 
Development of the game started in 2017. The game was released for Steam, PlayStation 4, Xbox One and Nintendo Switch on August 10, 2021.

It is the second game developed by Russian team Morteshka. Their previous project, The Mooseman, takes inspiration from Finno-Ugric lore and the Chud tribes of Northern Europe.

Reception 

Rock Paper Shotgun found that while the card battles were sometimes ill-balanced, they praised the game for its specific approach to Russian folklore, stating that it was where it "shows its heart".

References

External links 
 

2021 video games
Adventure games
Role-playing video games
Indie video games
Single-player video games
Linux games
MacOS games
Nintendo Switch games
PlayStation 4 games
Video games developed in Russia
Windows games
Video games set in the 19th century
Video games set in Russia
Video games based on mythology
Video games based on Slavic mythology
Video games based on Finno-Ugric mythology
Video games about witchcraft
Xbox One games
Video games featuring female protagonists
Morteshka games